Qaraxanlı (also, Qaraxanli and Karakhanly) is a village and municipality in the Aghjabadi Rayon of Azerbaijan.  It has a population of 900.

References 

Populated places in Aghjabadi District